"Love Suite" is a song by Blue System. It is the fourth track on their 1988 second studio album, Body Heat. A remixed version of the song was released as a single in the spring of 1989.

The single debuted at number 74 in West Germany for the week of April 10, 1989, peaking at number 14 three weeks later.

Composition 
The song is written and produced by Dieter Bohlen.

Charts

References

External links 
 

1988 songs
1989 singles
Blue System songs
Hansa Records singles
Songs written by Dieter Bohlen
Song recordings produced by Dieter Bohlen